Pervomaisk is a popular toponym in Ukraine. While it is a Russian name, it is more popular for its Ukrainian counterpart "Pershotravnia".

Populated places
Urban localities
Pervomaisk, Luhansk Oblast, a city in Luhansk Oblast, Ukraine
Pervomaisk, Mykolaiv Oblast, a city in Mykolaiv Oblast, Ukraine

Rural localities
Pervomaisk, Kirovohrad Oblast, a village of Novoukrainka Raion in Kirovohrad Oblast, Ukraine
Pervomaisk, Bilovodsk Raion, a village of Bilovodsk Raion in Luhansk Oblast, Ukraine
Pervomaisk, Svatove Raion, a former name of village Travneve in Luhansk Oblast, Ukraine

Administrative divisions
 Pervomaisk Raion, one of raions of Ukraine centered in Pervomaisk, Mykolaiv Oblast

See also
Pershotravensk, a Ukrainian analogue name for a town in Dnipropetrovsk Oblast, Ukraine
Pervomaysk (disambiguation)
Pervomaysky (disambiguation)